Ecclefechan railway station was a station which served the rural area around Ecclefechan, south of Lockerbie in Applegarth parish, Scottish county of Dumfries and Galloway. It was served by local trains on what is now known as the West Coast Main Line. The nearest station for Ecclefechan is now at Lockerbie.

History 
Opened by the Caledonian Railway, it became part of the London Midland and Scottish Railway during the Grouping of 1923 and was then closed by British Railways in 1960. The station had a goods shed with a signal box on the platform next to it. Several sidings were present and a minor road to Nether Collinhirst had run through the site.

Accidents and incidents
On 28 January 1854 an accident occurred near Ecclefechan when a goods train which left Glasgow for Carlisle on the evening of the 27th, was, after repeated mishaps, brought to a stand between the Ecclefechan and Kirtlebridge stations. The injuries to the passengers were not serious; two ladies suffered slightly, and the driver was hurt when he jumped from the engine of the passenger train, which, as well as the van of the goods train, was badly damaged.
On 21 July 1945, an express passenger train overran signals and was in collision with a freight train that was being shunted. Two people were killed and 31 were injured.

The site today 

Trains pass at speed on the electrified West Coast Main Line. The station has been demolished, however part of one of the platforms survives.

References

Notes

Sources

External links
 Rail Brit

Disused railway stations in Dumfries and Galloway
Railway stations in Great Britain opened in 1847
Railway stations in Great Britain closed in 1960
Former Caledonian Railway stations
1847 establishments in Scotland